Amita Chatterjee (born 13 September 1950) is a philosopher of science and logician and is professor emerita at the School of Cognitive Science of Jadavpur University in Kolkata, India.  In 2019 her contributions to philosophy were recognized with the publication of a 2-volume festschrift in her honour: Mind and Cognition- An Interdisciplinary Sharing (Essays in Honour of Amita Chatterjee) by Kumtala Bhattacharya, Madhucchanda Sen and Smita Sirker.

Biography  

Chatterjee studied at Presidency College, Kolkata and was a professor of philosophy at Jadavpur University from 1979 to 2010. During this time, she co-ordinated the Centre for Cognitive Science at Jadavpur University and was the Head of the Department of Philosophy. From 2010 to 2011, she was the first Vice Chancellor of Presidency University, Kolkata. After this, she returned to Jadavpur University. From 2016 to 2019, she served as Second Vice President of the Division for Logic, Methodology and Philosophy of Science and Technology. She served as editor for numerous academic journals, among them Philosophy East and West, and has been an important member of the Calcutta Logic Circle a group of logicians from mathematics, philosophy and computer science in West Bengal.

References 

Philosophers of science
1950 births
Living people
Academic staff of Jadavpur University
West Bengal academics